Disaster Transport (formerly Avalanche Run) was an enclosed steel bobsled roller coaster built by Intamin at Cedar Point in Sandusky, Ohio, United States. It was notable as being the only indoor roller coaster at Cedar Point, the only bobsled roller coaster in the Midwestern United States, and the only enclosed bobsled roller coaster in the world at its debut.  The name of the ride stems from a rearrangement of the letters "Dispatch Master Transport", which could still be seen in the ride's logo in its later years. Before the ride was enclosed, the supports and outer sides of the track were painted blue.

History
Disaster Transport was originally known as Avalanche Run and was entirely outdoors. On October 19, 1984, Cedar Point announced that Avalanche Run would be added to the park. The ride opened in 1985. It was built next to the beach, on the former spot of Jumbo Jet and later, WildCat. Many other rides also had to be relocated. The original ride cost $3.4 million: $1.9 million to manufacture and $1.5 million to install.

Renovation

On October 22, 1989, Cedar Point announced that Avalanche Run would receive a major refurbishment and be renamed Disaster Transport for the 1990 season. ITEC Productions, Inc. was chosen to renovate the ride, completely enclosing it in a show building. The renovation included the addition of a space-themed queue and ride along with special effect lighting, two robot animatronics, and sound. The special effects and construction cost approximately $4 million. On the outside of the building, "12 E" was written, which had caused numerous rumors as to its meanings. On August 3, 2005, it was revealed that it stood for the 12th ride designed by the ITEC employee, Eric.

Not long after the changes to the ride in 1990, the special effects began to deteriorate due to a lack of upkeep. By the time the ride closed, many of the effects were no longer active or had been covered up. Blacklight reactant paint lined the walls, mostly in the form of handprints or outlines of scenes. These gave a 3-D appearance when the rider wore special glasses purchased at the beginning of the queue.

Closure

After Matt Ouimet replaced Richard Kinzel as the CEO of Cedar Fair in 2012, he decided that Disaster Transport could no longer be salvaged. The ride was becoming an outdated attraction, as well as an eyesore. On July 13, 2012, Cedar Point announced that Disaster Transport would close on July 29, 2012. It was the second roller coaster at Cedar Point to close in 2012. A charity auction was held for the final riders, benefiting the Give Kids the World charity foundation. The last ride was given at 11:53 PM on July 29, with the lights turned on.

The ride started demolition on August 6, using about 380 trucks to transport scrap materials. A portion of track, two cars and the main entrance sign were to be donated to the National Roller Coaster Museum. Less than a month later on August 29, the last section of Disaster Transport was demolished. The 12E part of the building was the last section left standing.
Cedar Point is still in possession of many of the props used in the ride and often use them for decorations for haunts during their HalloweeKends event. And as of May 2021, Dave, one of the animatronics used in the ride's queue line, is on display in a gift shop adjacent from GateKeeper, Disaster Transport's replacement.

Incident
On June 7, 1990 at around 4:30 p.m, three people were injured when a 6 ft-diameter foam asteroid prop weighing between 100-150 pounds overhanging the track fell into the ride trough and was struck by an oncoming bobsled carrying eight passengers. Two of the victims were treated at a local hospital and released and the third was flown to a Michigan hospital to be treated for a neck injury and was later released.

Ride experience

Disaster Transport was a bobsled roller coaster, meaning the wheels were not attached to a track as on a conventional roller coaster. The cars — resembling bobsleds — operated within a steel trough, on which they were allowed to operate freely. This allowed the ride to swing from side to side when turning sharp corners, as an actual bobsled would. Guests would enter 10 passenger bobsleds, secured by a lap bar. After leaving the "launch area", the bobsled traveled up the  lift hill at a 15-degree-angle, which featured red and blue blinking lights on the sides. After reaching the top of the lift hill, it curved to the right, dropping  at a 27-degree-angle and reaching a top speed of 40 mph (64 km/h). After that, it curved to the left into a mid course brake run. After the mid course brake run, the bobsled turned left followed by several banked turns and curves and two more brake runs. One cycle of the ride lasted about 2 minutes and 32 seconds.

Theme
After the ride was renovated in 1990, a new space theme was given. The story of the ride was the passengers had been enlisted to deliver cargo from a suborbital factory to a station in Alaska. Large screen projections, simulated lasers, mist, and recordings were added to the ride. In the queue, guests would go through three rooms including Rocket Recovery, Mission Control and Repair Bay. The original entrance to the ride was located next to Troika. During HalloWeekends, the park would change the entrance of Disaster Transport to under the lift hill, leaving the one next to Troika to be used for the Halloween Haunt. For the 2009 season, the entrance was permanently changed to under the lift hill. When the entrance was changed, the Rocket Recovery and Mission Control rooms were closed, leaving the Repair Bay the only room guests walked through.

Story
The ride experience was different and much more immersive in its earlier years. The story of the ride was that the riders were Dispatch Master Transport’s first public passengers and they were bound for a receiving station in Alaska. The alleged company had exclusively transported cargo until that time. The riders' shuttle would also be carrying cargo that included a highly volatile fuel nicknamed "Really Big Bang" (RBB-11 for short).

Passengers would enter under the show building through a doorway labeled "Transport Entry". Upon entering, eerie, futuristic electronic music would play. Every few minutes, a pre-recorded voice would come over the speakers and wish the riders a safe journey and remind them of the company motto: "We get you there in 5 minutes or less, or we don't get you there at all." 
The first room was the Terminal. Black lights lit the room. Travel posters and a diagram of the state-of-the-art space transports the riders would be traveling in were on the side walls. Two airport type loading gates were on the far wall next to two TV monitors which would randomly display videos of the head of the company "The Dispatch Master", travel ads, or random space pilots. Between the two gates was a sort of receptionist desk. An employee sitting at the desk would press a button that would supposedly open the gates so the riders could enter the launch pad. When the button was pressed, smoke would pour out from under the gates. The staff member would explain that wasn't supposed to happen and would instruct the riders to take a detour through the service rooms of the hangar to get to the launch pad.

Walking into the next room, named the Control Room, guests would see an orange mission control robot named Dave working up on a platform in the left corner of the room at a desk labeled "Dispatch Control". Dave would be taking and receiving calls from workers and space shuttles (according to him, one had crashed outside of Akron). In between calls, he would explain the riders' mission and chat with them. Dave would also constantly malfunction causing his speaking to skip and glitch out causing him to say "Disaster Transport" instead of "Dispatch Master Transport”. 

Walking down another hallway, guests could see a 3-D mural of a warehouse full of crates behind a large window. Turning left at the end of the hall, guests would enter the Repair Bay which would later become the only area of the queue where riders would enter. This room contained a robotic foreman animatronic named Franc, supervising the repair of a rocket by robotic arms. Franc would bark orders at the arms but the arms would ignore him, much to Franc's frustration. Also within the room were suspended conveyor baskets carrying spare rocket parts, a forklift, and a laser scanner on the far wall that would flash "REJECT" after scanning the parts on the conveyor. A small room outside the Repair Bay had the company's logo subtly broken to reveal the ride's true name. 

Guests would climb a short stairway and enter the launch area. The ride vehicles would move from behind a curtain without passengers. The ride would begin after ten or less riders were loaded onto a rocket. The rocket would move out onto a block section where an on-board computer system would welcome the riders. Once the cargo was "loaded" onto the rocket, the launch sequence would begin. Two spinning laser light spheres would project a star field around the rocket as it climbed the lift. Nearing the top, the computer would announce to the riders that they had achieved orbit. But upon reaching the top of the hill, the computer would detect aggressive "space pirates" near their location and began to take evasive maneuvers as the rocket descended down the first drop. 

The ride's showbuilding contained numerous props and scenes to make the riders feel as if they were under attack while flying through outer space. The riders would speed by other rockets similar to theirs, explosions, meteors, debris, video projections and a satellite that would fire lasers at the passengers. Halfway through the ride, the on-board computer would shout, "I'm losing control, I'm losing control!" before an Alaskan landscape came into view. Here, the computer would scream, "Look out! We're gonna crash!" The rocket then banked right and entered the final brake run. White lights would strobe accompanied by a gust of wind to simulate the rocket crashing into snow. Riders would enter the unloading station where they were greeted by an employee that yelled, "WELCOME TO ALASKA!" The riders would disembark their vehicle and exit on the left side of the platform where a sign read, "Thank you for flying with Dispatch Master Transport!".

Building

The building was also used as a storage facility for the park. During HalloWeekends, much of the original queue area was used to house a haunt attraction. It was first used in 1997 for the haunt, Cedar Point Cemetery. In 2000, it was transformed into the Egyptian themed, Pharaoh's Secret haunted house. In 2009, it was transformed into Happy Jack's Toy Factory, a haunted toy factory.

The ride, though indoors, would close in any type of rain. Because of leaks in the structure, water pooled in the trough, warranting a shutdown. Typically, the ride would remain shut down after a period of rain as the crew would have to cycle several trains through the circuit in order for it to dry. Although the ride was enclosed, the storage track remained outdoors with a large door that opened when the storage track was needed.

See also
 2012 in amusement parks

References

External links

 Official POV of Disaster Transport
 Disaster Transport at The Point Online
 Disaster Transport at Point Buzz

Cedar Point
Roller coasters operated by Cedar Fair
Former roller coasters in Ohio
Buildings and structures demolished in 2012
Demolished buildings and structures in Ohio
1985 establishments in Ohio
2012 disestablishments in Ohio
Outer space in amusement parks